Alexis Blanc (born 24 November 1970) is a French freestyle skier. He competed in the men's aerials event at the 1994 Winter Olympics.

References

1970 births
Living people
French male freestyle skiers
Olympic freestyle skiers of France
Freestyle skiers at the 1994 Winter Olympics
Sportspeople from Annecy